WMOZ (106.9 FM, "The Moose - Classic Hits 106.9") is a radio station licensed to serve Moose Lake, Minnesota. The station is owned by Fond du Lac Band of Lake Superior Chippewa. It airs a classic hits music format.

The station was assigned the WMOZ call letters by the Federal Communications Commission on June 26, 2002.

Programming
In addition to its usual music programming, WMOZ carries local high school sports and certain professional sports broadcasts of regional interest. As of the 2007-2008 baseball season, WMOZ is an affiliate of the Minnesota Twins radio network.

History
In January 2003, the station dropped its simulcast of WKLK-FM and flipped to a country music format. On November 26, 2003, the station flipped to an Oldies format from Jones Radio Network branded as "Oldies 106.9". It eventually shifted to classic hits as "Classic Hits 106.9".

References

External links
WMOZ website

Radio stations in Minnesota
Classic hits radio stations in the United States
Carlton County, Minnesota
Radio stations established in 1998
Fond du Lac Band of Lake Superior Chippewa